Nona Reeves stylized NONA REEVES is a Japanese pop band founded in 1995 by musicians Gota Nishidera, Kensuke Okuda and Shigeru Komatsu. The name Nona Reeves derives from the respective name and surname of Nona Gaye and Martha Reeves. In 1996 Nona Reeves released their debut album SIDECAR under the independent label Giant Robot a division of Under Flower Records. In 1997 Nona Reeves released their first major single GOLF after joining the Warner Music Japan label.

Following being signed to Warner the group released material consistently under various labels throughout the 1990s and 2000s. In 2009, following their eleventh album GO the group went on a four-year recording hiatus until 2013 with the release of Pop Station. Nona Reeves have continued to consistently release new recorded material since 2014.

History
During his childhood Gota Nisihidera was enthralled by the works of Michael Jackson and George Michael of Wham! he had become a lover of western pop of the 1980s. When studying in high school Nishidera learned to play percussion and brass instruments and by the time he became enrolled in Waseda University he had become a skilled musician. Nishidera became a member of a musical circle consisting of numerous bands and musicians known as "Traveling Light". During this, Nishidera began working on his own solo project he called Nona Reeves with the first project being a song titled "Bird Song". Two other local musicians Kensuke Okuda and Shigeru Komatsu who also were among The Traveling Light circle and members of separate bands and became the first members of Nona Reeves along with two other local musicians.

In 1996, Nona Reeves was signed by Giant Robot Records a subsidiary of Under Flower. Under Giant Robot, they recorded their debut independent album SIDECAR which released on December 13, 1996

Members
 Gota Nishidera (Lead Vocals)
 Kensuke Okuda (Guitar & Keyboard)
 Shigeru Komatsu (Drums & Vocals)

Past members
 Shinobu Morooka
 Koichi Oyama

Discography

Singles and EPs

Studio albums

Live albums

Cover albums

Remix albums

Compilation albums

References

External links
 
 
 Nona Reeves Twitter

Musical groups established in 1995
1995 establishments in Japan
Japanese pop music groups
Japanese-language singers
J-pop music groups
Warner Music Group artists
Shibuya-kei